The Imperial Highway is a west-east thoroughfare in the counties of Los Angeles, Orange, Riverside, San Diego, and Imperial in California. The main portion of the existing route begins at Vista Del Mar in Los Angeles near the Los Angeles International Airport and ends at the Anaheim–Orange city line at Via Escola where it becomes Cannon Street. Historically, the Imperial Highway extended from Vista Del Mar to Calexico, where a portion of the highway still exists. The original route was replaced with other highways, leading the older portions of the Imperial Highway to fall out of use.

Route

Between SR 91 and SR 39, Imperial Highway is signed as State Route 90. A de facto freeway portion of the route in Yorba Linda is also known as the Richard M. Nixon Parkway.

The portion in Los Angeles County between Lakewood Boulevard and Valley View Avenue is located about one mile north of, and runs parallel to, Rosecrans Avenue.

Cities
Starting from Cannon Street & Via Escola in Orange, going east to west Cannon Street becomes Imperial Highway upon entering Anaheim. The highway then passes through the cities and communities of Anaheim Hills, Yorba Linda, Placentia, Brea, Fullerton, La Habra, La Mirada, Santa Fe Springs (some sections in La Mirada and Santa Fe Springs are next to unincorporated LA County), Norwalk, Downey, South Gate, Lynwood, Los Angeles (Watts, and South LA – a portion after South LA is in unincorporated LA County), Inglewood, Hawthorne, El Segundo (southside of street only), and Westchester (part of Los Angeles on the northside). Imperial Highway ends at Dockweiler Beach on Vista Del Mar near Playa Del Rey, just past LAX.

Freeways
Along its route, Imperial Highway crosses over or under these freeways from west to east:

 Interstate 105
 Interstate 405
 Interstate 110
 Interstate 710
 Interstate 605
 Interstate 5
 California State Route 57
 California State Route 91
Interstate 8

Transportation
Metro Local lines 120 and formerly 625 run through Imperial Highway, as well as Norwalk Transit line 4; Metro line 625 ran between Pershing Drive and La Cienega Boulevard. Metro line 120 runs between Aviation Boulevard and Norwalk Station, and Norwalk line 4 between Norwalk Station and Beach Boulevard. Imperial intersects with the Metro A and C Lines at Wilmington Avenue in Willowbrook at the Willowbrook/Rosa Parks station.

Western terminus coordinates (El Segundo): 
Eastern terminus coordinates (Anaheim):

History
Imperial Highway was initially conceived as a commercial route connecting Imperial County to Los Angeles County. A segment remains today in Imperial County which connects Interstate 8 near Ocotillo. Another segment adjacent to Lake Elsinore (Riverside County) was once indicated on 1960s vicinity maps by H.M. Gousha (Gousha), publisher of street maps.

Other uses
There are other Imperial Highways in the United States, including one in San Diego (better known as Imperial Avenue) and in the Detroit suburbs of Redford Township, Michigan and Westland, Michigan. Westland's version runs two blocks, northeast from Hambleton Street, across John Hauk Road and stopping at Pardo Street.

References

Further reading

External links

Streets in Orange County, California
Streets in Los Angeles County, California
Streets in Los Angeles
Southern California freeways
Anaheim, California
Yorba Linda, California
Fullerton, California
La Habra, California
La Mirada, California
Santa Fe Springs, California
Norwalk, California
Downey, California
Paramount, California
South Gate, California
Lynwood, California
Watts, Los Angeles
South Los Angeles
Inglewood, California
Hawthorne, California
El Segundo, California
Named highways in California